Collection or Collections may refer to:
 Cash collection, the function of an accounts receivable department
 Collection (church), money donated by the congregation during a church service
 Collection agency, agency to collect cash
 Collections management (museum)
 Collection (museum), objects in a particular field forms the core basis for the museum
 Fonds in archives
 Private collection, sometimes just called "collection"
 Collection (Oxford colleges), a beginning-of-term exam or Principal's Collections
 Collection (horse), a horse carrying more weight on his hindquarters than his forehand
 Collection (racehorse), an Irish-bred, Hong Kong based Thoroughbred racehorse
 Collection (publishing), a gathering of books under the same title at the same publisher
 Scientific collection, any systematic collection of objects for scientific study

Collection may also refer to:

Computing
 Collection (abstract data type), the abstract concept of collections in computer science
 Collection (linking), the act of linkage editing in computing
 Garbage collection (computing), automatic memory management method

Mathematics

 Set (mathematics)
 Class (set theory)
 Family of sets
 Indexed family
 Multiset
 Parametric family

Albums

Collection

 Collection (2NE1 album), 2012
 Collection (Agnes album), 2013
 Collection (Arvingarna album), 2002
 Collection (Jason Becker album), 2008
 Collection (Tracy Chapman album), 2001
 Collection (The Charlatans album)
 Collection (Dave Grusin album), 1989
 Collection (The Jam album)
 Collection (Wynonna Judd album)
 Collection (Magnus Uggla album), 1985
 Collection (Men Without Hats album), 1996
 Collection (MFÖ album), 2003
 Collection (Mike Oldfield album), 2002
 Collection (Praxis album), 1998
 Collection (The Rankin Family album), 1996
 Collection (Lee Ritenour album), 1991
 Collection (Joe Sample album), 1991
 Collection (Spyro Gyra album), 1991
 Collection (The Stranglers album), 1998
 Collection (Suicidal Tendencies album), 1993
 Collection (Thee Michelle Gun Elephant album), 2001
 Collection (The Warratahs album), 2003
 Collection: The Shrapnel Years (Greg Howe album), 2006
 Collection: The Shrapnel Years (Tony MacAlpine album), 2006
 Collection: The Shrapnel Years (Vinnie Moore album), 2006
 Collection I, a 1986 compilation album of songs by the Misfits
 Collection II, a 1995 companion album to the Misfits' Collection I

Collections

 Collections (Alexia album)
 Collections (Rick Astley album), 2006
 Collections (Cypress Hill album)
 Collections (Terence Trent D'Arby album), 2006
 Collections (Delphic album), 2013
 Collections (Amanda Marshall album), 2006
 Collections (Charlie Major album), 2006
 Collections (Red Norvo, Art Pepper, Joe Morello and Gerry Wiggins album), 1957
 Collections (Yanni album), 2008
 Collections (The Young Rascals album), 1967

Other uses 
 Collection #1, a database of sets of email addresses and passwords
 Collections care, to prevent or delay the deterioration of cultural heritage
 Collection class, in object-oriented programming
 Generated collection, a musical scale formed by repeatedly adding a constant interval around the chromatic circle

See also 
 A Collection (disambiguation)
 Aggregate (disambiguation) 
 Collected (disambiguation)
 Collecting
 Collector (disambiguation)